Indifferentism is the belief held by some that no one religion or philosophy is superior to another. 

Religious indifferentism is to be distinguished from political indifferentism. Political indifferentism relates to the policy of a State that treats all the religions within its borders as being on an equal footing before the law of the country. Indifferentism is not to be confounded with religious indifference. Indifferentism is primarily a theory disparaging the value of religions; religious indifference designates the conduct of those who, whether they do or do not believe in the necessity and utility of religion, do in fact neglect to fulfill its duties.

Catholic Church 

The Catholic Church ascribes indifferentism to many atheistic, materialistic, pantheistic, and agnostic philosophies. There are three basic types of indifferentism described by Catholic apologetics: absolute, restricted, and liberal or latitudinarian indifferentism. Indifferentism was first explicitly identified and opposed by Pope Gregory XVI, in his encyclical Mirari vos.

Catholic teachings on indifferentism
In the Catholic Church, the belief that one religion is as good as another, and that all religions are equally valid paths to salvation, is believed to be false. One argument the Church advances is that nobody believes that a religion based on human sacrifice and the subjugation of rivals is as good, true, and beautiful as one based on heroic love of God and neighbor. The  condemnation of indifferentism as a heresy is closely linked to the dogmatic definition that outside the Church there is no salvation, a complex idea postulating that many people are followers of Christ without any specific understanding that it is in fact Jesus whom they are following. See also the Catholic concept of the "Baptism of Desire". In support of this stance the Congregation for the Doctrine of the Faith has said "This does not lessen the sincere respect that the Church has for the various religious traditions, recognizing in them elements of truth and goodness."

According to the Catholic Church, absolute indifferentism results in a willingness to concede any position.

Restricted indifferentism
Catholicism also opposes as "indifferentism" a spectrum of pragmatic ideas that admit the necessity of religion because of its positive influence on human life; but which hold that all religions are equally true. The classic advocate of this theory is Jean-Jacques Rousseau, who maintains, in his Emile, that God looks only to the sincerity of intention, and that everybody can serve him by remaining in the religion in which they were raised, or by converting to any other that pleases them more (Emile, III). This doctrine is widely advocated today on the grounds that, beyond the truth of God's existence, we can attain to no certain religious knowledge; and that, since God has left us thus in uncertainty, he will be pleased with whatever form of worship we sincerely offer him. This idea appears to be tenable only in a cultural context that takes most core ethical beliefs for granted: it runs into serious trouble as soon as the basis of ethics comes into question. 

From a Roman Catholic perspective, to say that all these irreconcilable beliefs are equally pleasing to God is to say that God has no preference for truth and to deny reason. The Roman Catholic Church argues that restricted indifferentism is no different from absolute indifferentism because while nominally acknowledging the utility of religion, to affirm that "all religions are equally good" ultimately means that religion is good for nothing.

Liberal or latitudinarian indifferentism
The Catholic Church also resists as indifferentism the belief that, since Christianity is the true religion, it makes no difference which of the several Christian denominations the believer chooses to join. Catholicism critiques Protestantism specifically for this sort of limited indifferentism, noting that many Protestant denominations do not claim any particular fidelity to the gospel, while maintaining that all forms of worship may be equally (read "indifferently") effective for the purpose of building a closer union with God: a latitudinarian position. Pope Pius XI explicitly criticized the ecumenical movement on these grounds in his 1928 encyclical, Mortalium animos. Since the Second Vatican Council the church has adopted a more committed approach towards ecumenism but the Pontifical Council for Promoting Christian Unity has also warned against the danger of doctrinal indifferentism within ecumenical dialogue.

Kant's absolute indifferentism
Immanuel Kant argues that absolute indifferentism represents an extreme form of skepticism that argues that there is no rational ground for accepting any philosophical position.

See also
Apatheism
Inclusionism
Religious pluralism

Notes

References
 
 Connell, Francis J., C. SS. R., Freedom of Worship (Paulist Press, 1947)
 Connell, Francis J., C. SS. R., Morals in Politics and Professions (Paulist Press, 1946)

External links
Religious indifferentism in the Catholic Encyclopedia.

Catholic theology and doctrine
Philosophy of religion
Relativism